Robert E. Johnson is an American mathematician, engineer and physicist, currently the John Lloyd Newcomb Professor Engineering Physics and Materials Science at University of Virginia, with interests on biomolecular, atmospheric and condensed-gas solids.

Education
He earned his B.S. at Colorado College in 1961, his M.S. at Wesleyan University in 1963 and his Ph.D. at University of Wisconsin and was also awarded an Honorary Degree at Uppsala University.

Selected publications
Johnson, R. E., Energetic Charged Particle Interaction with Atmospheres and Surfaces; Physics and Chemistry of Space. Springer Verlag (1990).
Johnson, R.E., Surface Chemistry in the Jovian Magnetosphere Radiation Johnson, R.E., Surface Boundary Layer Atmospheres, in Atmospheres in the Solar System: Comparative Aeronomy Geophysical Monograph 130, 203–219 (2002).
Bringa, E.M. and R.E. Johnson, A New Model for Cosmic-rays Ion Erosion of Volatiles from Grains in the interstellar Medium, Astronphys. J. 603, 159–164 (2004).
Johnson, R.E., M.H. Burger, T.A. Cassidy, F. Leblanc, M. Marconi, W.H. Smyth, Composition and Detection of Europa's Sputter-Induced Atmosphere, Chapter  in Europa, Eds. R. Pappalardo et al. pp 507–527 (2009).

References

Year of birth missing (living people)
Living people
University of Virginia faculty
20th-century American mathematicians
21st-century American engineers
21st-century American physicists
21st-century American mathematicians
Colorado College alumni
Wesleyan University alumni
University of Wisconsin–Madison alumni